Dafoe is a special service area in the Canadian province of Saskatchewan within the Rural Municipality of Big Quill No. 308 and Census Division No. 10. It was a village prior to August 2018. Dafoe is located east of the intersection of Highway 6 and the Yellowhead Highway southwest of Big Quill Lake, the Dafoe Brook flows to the east of the community. Dafoe marks the far west end of the area known to Icelandic settlers in Saskatchewan as the Lakes Settlement (Icelandic: Vatnabyggð).

History 
Dafoe incorporated as a village on May 28, 1920. It restructured on July 31, 2018, relinquishing its village status in favour of becoming a special service area under the jurisdiction of the Rural Municipality of Big Quill No. 308.

Demographics 

See also 
 RCAF Station Dafoe
 List of communities in Saskatchewan
 List of special service areas in Saskatchewan

References 

Big Quill No. 308, Saskatchewan
Special service areas in Saskatchewan
Icelandic settlements in Saskatchewan
Division No. 10, Saskatchewan